Cho Se-whee (born 14 June 1991), also spelled Cho Se-hui, is a South Korean model and beauty pageant titleholder who was crowned Miss Universe Korea for 2017. Cho represented South Korea at Miss Universe 2017.

Miss Gyeonggi 2014
Cho competed at the Miss Gyeonggi 2014 pageant, becoming 1st runner-up.

Miss Korea 2014
Cho competed at Miss Korea 2014, but did not place.

Miss Universe Korea 2017
Cho was crowned Miss Universe Korea 2017 on October 23, 2016 by her predecessor Jenny Kim. She also won the Miss Talent award.

Miss Universe 2017
Cho represented South Korea at Miss Universe 2017 in Las Vegas, but did not place.

General references

References

1991 births
Living people
South Korean beauty pageant winners
Miss Universe Korea
Miss Universe 2017 contestants